"Feelings" is a song recorded by American pop rock band Maroon 5 for their fifth studio album V (2014). It was written by Adam Levine, Shellback, and Oscar Görres and produced by the latter two. It was sent to U.S. Adult Contemporary and contemporary hit radio on September 14 and 15, respectively, as the fifth and final single from the album. The official artwork for the single was unveiled by Maroon 5's official Twitter account on October 6, 2015. Although a music video for the track was recorded at the Playboy Mansion, its release was scrapped.

Background 
The song appeared on the band's fifth studio album V, which was released in August 2014. "Feelings" was announced as the fifth single of the album in July 2015. It was sent to US Adult Contemporary radio on September 14, 2015 and to US Mainstream radio the following day. The official artwork for the single shows a woman's legs and debuted online on October 6, 2015.

Composition 
"Feelings" is written in the key of E minor with a tempo of 122 beats per minute.  Levine's vocals span from B2 to G5 in the song.

Charts

Release history

References 

2014 songs
2015 singles 
Maroon 5 songs
Songs written by Adam Levine
Songs written by Shellback (record producer)
Songs written by Oscar Görres
American disco songs
Song recordings produced by Shellback (record producer)
222 Records singles
Interscope Records singles
Songs about dancing
Torch songs